Diuris amplissima, commonly called the giant donkey orchid is a species of orchid that is endemic to the south-west of Western Australia. It is a rare species and the largest Diuris in Western Australia. It has two or three leaves at its base and up to seven purple and dull yellowish-brown flowers on a tall flowering stem.

Description
There is a ridge-like callus  in the mid-line of the base of the labellum. Flowering occurs from September to November.

Taxonomy and naming
Diuris amplissima was first formally described in 1991 by David Jones from a specimen collected near Moodiarrup, and the description was published in Australian Orchid Review. The specific epithet (amplissima) is a Latin word meaning "largest", referring to the "impressive flowers".

Distribution and habitat
The giant donkey orchid grows in woodland and forest between Porongurup and Capel in the Avon Wheatbelt, Jarrah Forest and Mallee biogeographic regions. It is a rare species, similar to D. magnifica but grows in heavier soils than the sandy habitat of that species.

Conservation
Diuris amplissima is classified as "not threatened" by the Western Australian Government Department of Parks and Wildlife.

References

amplissima
Endemic orchids of Australia
Orchids of Western Australia
Endemic flora of Western Australia
Plants described in 1991